Moon Over The Freeway is the second studio album from the folk/swing band The Ditty Bops released in 2006.  Package artwork is by Rick Whitmore and photography is by Don Spiro.

Track listing
 "Moon Over The Freeway" – 3:15
 "Angel With An Attitude" – 2:31
 "Fall Awake" – 3:40
 "Aluminum Can" – 3:28
 "Fish To Fry" – 3:09
 "In The Meantime" – 2:39
 "It's A Shame" – 2:18
 "Waking Up In The City" – 3:15
 "Growing Upside Down" – 2:48
 "Get Up 'N' Go" – 2:12
 "Bye Bye Love" – 2:33
 "Nosy Neighbor" – 3:04
 "Your Head's Too Big" – 2:33

Personnel
Abby DeWald - vocals, acoustic guitar
Amanda Barrett - vocals, mandolin, washboard
Greg Rutledge - piano, accordion
Ian Walker - bass
John Lambdin - violin, lap steel, guitar
Mitchell Froom - keyboards
Pete Thomas - drums, percussion
Davey Faragher - electric bass
Val McCallum - electric guitar
Rich Sherwood - drums

2006 albums
The Ditty Bops albums
Albums produced by Mitchell Froom